Gotri is a village in Bajura District in the Seti Zone of north-western Nepal. It was founded in 1954. At the time of the 1991 Nepal census it had a population of 3,545 and had 584 houses in the village.

References

Populated places in Bajura District